Anna Welin (born 25 March 1994) is a Swedish footballer playing for Brøndby in the Danish Women's League.

Career
She played as a midfielder for Kristianstad in the Damallsvenskan. She previously played for LdB FC Malmö from 2012 to 2013.

Honours

Club
LdB FC Malmö
Winner
 Damallsvenskan: 2013
 Super Cup: 2012

Runner-up
 Damallsvenskan: 2012

References

External links
 
 
 Anna Welin at Soccerdonna.de 
 Anna Welin at Fussballtransfers.com  
 

1994 births
Living people
Swedish women's footballers
Damallsvenskan players
FC Rosengård players
Vittsjö GIK players
Women's association football midfielders
Kristianstads DFF players
IF Limhamn Bunkeflo players